Keith Hollis Thompson II (born April 3, 1991) is an American professional basketball who last played for the Sacramento Kings of the NBA. He played college basketball for Georgetown University. He also played for the Philadelphia 76ers and New Orleans Pelicans

High school career
Thompson attended Loyola High School in Los Angeles, California. As a junior in 2007–08, he averaged 18.6 points, 9.0 rebounds and 4.0 assists per game, going on to be named the league's most valuable player.

Considered a four-star recruit by Rivals.com, Thompson was listed as the No. 12 small forward and the No. 63 player in the nation in 2009.

College career
In January 2009, Thompson enrolled at Georgetown University and practiced with the team during the second semester.

During his three-season collegiate career at Georgetown, Thompson averaged 8.7 points, 4.1 rebounds and 1.1 assists in 24.6 minutes per game, while setting a school record with 44.0% three-point field goal shooting. In the 2011-12 season, he earned All-Big East Honorable Mention honors after averaging 12.8 ppg and scoring in double figures on 25 occasions.

Professional career

Tulsa 66ers (2012–2013)
After going undrafted in the 2012 NBA draft, Thompson signed with the Oklahoma City Thunder on July 11, 2012. On October 27, 2012, he was waived by the Thunder after appearing in three preseason games. Four days later, he was acquired by the Tulsa 66ers of the NBA Development League as an affiliate player of the Thunder. In 51 games for Tulsa in 2012–13, he averaged 8.0 points and 3.9 rebounds per game.

Philadelphia 76ers (2013–2017)
In July 2013, Thompson joined the San Antonio Spurs for the 2013 NBA Summer League. On September 24, 2013, he signed with the Philadelphia 76ers. He became an important part of the 76ers' rotation during the 2013–14 season as he contributed as a defender and a three-point shooter. He became the starting small forward during the second half of the season and scored a then career-high 18 points with six made three-pointers on April 5 in a 105–101 loss to the Brooklyn Nets. He finished the season leading all rookies in three-point field goal percentage with 40.1%.

In July 2014, Thompson joined the 76ers for the 2014 NBA Summer League, where he helped lead the team to the Orlando Summer league championship. On December 13, 2014, he tied his career high of 21 points in a 120–115 overtime loss to the Memphis Grizzlies. On February 3, 2015, he set a new career high with 23 points in a 105–98 win over the Denver Nuggets.

In 2015–16, Thompson proved to be a valuable member of the 76ers on offense and was a serviceable defender. While his shooting numbers declined slightly from 2014–15, he was still the team's best long-range shooter. Thompson's field goal percentage (41.3 to 39.7) and three-point percentage (40.1 to 38.0) each dropped in 2015–16, but he still averaged career highs in both points (9.8) and rebounds (3.5) per game. In the 76ers' season finale on April 13, 2016, Thompson scored a season-high 21 points in 115–105 loss to the Chicago Bulls.

On June 29, 2016, the 76ers exercised the fourth-year team option on Thompson's contract, retaining him for the 2016–17 season. On January 4, 2017, he was waived by the 76ers. Thompson is currently 6th all time in Sixers history in three-point FG% (38.9%).

Austin and New Orleans (2017)
On January 24, 2017, Thompson was acquired by the Windy City Bulls of the NBA Development League. The following day, he was traded to the Austin Spurs in exchange for Jarell Eddie. On February 23, 2017, Thompson signed a 10-day contract with the New Orleans Pelicans. On March 5, 2017, he signed a second 10-day contract with the Pelicans. Following the expiration of his second 10-day contract, Thompson returned to Austin. Thompson averaged 14.4 ppg for Austin during the 2016-17 season, shooting 44% from 3.

Olympiacos (2017–2018)
On August 10, 2017, Thompson signed a one-year contract with the Greek club Olympiacos. He was released from the Greek club on May 5, 2018.

Northern Arizona Suns (2018–2019)
On December 17, 2018, the Northern Arizona Suns announced that they had acquired the returning rights to Thompson and Livio Jean-Charles from the Austin Spurs for the returning rights to Isaiah Canaan and Josh Gray. On next day, the Northern Arizona Suns announced that they had activated Thompson.

Thompson averaged 16.6 ppg, 6.3 rpg, and 2.5 apg during the 2018-19 G-League season, shooting 35% from 3 and 80% from the free-throw line.

Crailsheim Merlins (2019)
On April 1, 2019, Thompson signed with Crailsheim Merlins.

Stockton Kings (2019–2020)
On October 11, 2019, Thompson signed with the Sacramento Kings for training camp. He was ultimately cut and assigned to their G League affiliate, the Stockton Kings.

Sacramento Kings (2022)
On March 23, 2022, the Sacramento Kings signed Thompson to a 10-day contract.

Career statistics

NBA

Regular season

|-
| align="left" | 
| align="left" | Philadelphia
| 77 || 41 || 22.6 || .460 || .401 || .712 || 3.2 || .9 || .7 || .2 || 6.0
|- 
| align="left" | 
| align="left" | Philadelphia
| 71 || 23 || 25.0 || .413 || .401 || .708 || 2.8 || 1.2 || .8 || .4 || 8.8
|-
| align="left" | 
| align="left" | Philadelphia
| 77 || 17 || 28.0 || .397 || .380 || .719 || 3.5 || 1.3 || .5 || .3 || 9.8
|-
| align="left" | 
| align="left" | Philadelphia
| 31 || 1 || 18.1 || .415 || .366 || .650 || 2.7 || .8 || .5 || .2 || 5.5
|-
| align="left" | 
| align="left" | New Orleans
| 9 || 8 || 21.2 || .268 || .250 || .667 || 3.1 || 1.0 || .7 || .0 || 3.8
|- class="sortbottom"
| align="center" colspan="2"| Career
| 265 || 90 || 24.2 || .413 || .386 || .707 || 3.1 || 1.1 || .6 || .3 || 7.7

EuroLeague

|-
| align="left" | 2017–18
| align="left" | Olympiacos
| 28 || 7 || 15.1 || .417 || .265 || .674 || 2.7 || .9 || .6 || .1 || 5.6 || 4.9
|- class="sortbottom"
| align="center" colspan="2"| Career
| 28 || 7 || 15.1 || .417 || .265 || .674 || 2.7 || .9 || .6 || .1 || 5.6 || 4.9

References

External links

Hollis Thompson at euroleague.net
Georgetown Hoyas bio

1991 births
Living people
African-American basketball players
American expatriate basketball people in Germany
American expatriate basketball people in Greece
American men's basketball players
Austin Spurs players
Basketball players from Los Angeles
Crailsheim Merlins players
Georgetown Hoyas men's basketball players
New Orleans Pelicans players
Northern Arizona Suns players
Olympiacos B.C. players
Philadelphia 76ers players
Shooting guards
Small forwards
Basketball players from Pasadena, California
Tulsa 66ers players
Undrafted National Basketball Association players
21st-century African-American sportspeople